The West Wales Championships originally founded as the Tenby Lawn Tennis Club Tournament was a men's and women's grass court tennis tournament first held the Tenby Lawn Tennis Club, Tenby, Pembrokeshire, South Wales in 1876. In 1881 it was renamed as the South Wales Championships In 1900 it was renamed again to the West Wales Championships. The tournament was staged until the outbreak of World War Two in 1939.

History
In 1876 the Tenby Lawn Club Tennis Tournament was first staged at the Tenby Lawn Tennis Club, Tenby, Pembrokeshire, South Wales. In 1881 the tournament changed its name to the South Wales Championships, and play was open to all residents who had resided for three months in all six southern counties of Wales. The first winner of the 1881 mens singles was Britain's L.G. Campbell. In 1885 the latter tournament was renamed as the South Wales and Monmouthshire Championships until 1900 when the Welsh Lawn Tennis Association moved the championships to Newport, Monmouthshire, South Wales. This tournament at Tenby, Pembrokshire was then renamed as the West Wales Championships which ran until 1939. The men competed for the West Wales Challenge Cup.

Venue
The original Tenby Cricket and Lawn Tennis Club was a former sports club situated on Heywood Lane, Tenby. It opened in the late-nineteenth century. The cricket club occupied land to the south side of Heywood Lane whilst the Tennis Club was located on the north side of Heywood Lane.  The Tennis club no longer exists and the land has been subsequently used for housing - this is the present Heywood Court. The cricket pitch still survives though. In 2009 a new Tenby Tennis Club was reformed.

Finals

Mens Singles
(incomplete roll) included:

Womens Singles
(incomplete roll)

References

Defunct tennis tournaments in the United Kingdom
Grass court tennis tournaments
Tennis tournaments in Wales